Restless Nation was a BBC Scotland television series, first shown in 1991, prior to the UK general election in 1992, and updated in 1996, prior to the 1997 general election. It spawned a book by Alan Clements, Kenny Farquharson and Kirsty Wark, in collaboration with Scotland on Sunday, published in 1996.

An analysis of the history of the movement for Scottish self-government, the TV series and the book were based on political interviews and archive material of political events since 1945.

The title of the series was a play on the name of the 1985 film Restless Natives.

See also
Politics of Scotland

References

1991 British television series debuts
1996 British television series endings
1991 establishments in Scotland
20th century in Scotland
1991 in politics
1996 in politics
1991 in Scotland
1996 in Scotland
1996 books
BBC Scotland television shows
Political books
Scottish independence